The Daring Young Man is a 1935 American comedy film directed by William A. Seiter and written by Sam Hellman, William Hurlbut and Glenn Tryon. The film stars James Dunn, Mae Clarke, Neil Hamilton, Sidney Toler, Warren Hymer and Stanley Fields. This is the film to be released on May 24, 1935, by Fox Film Corporation.

Plot
Two top reporters, male and female (Dunn, Clarke), fall in love and plan to marry, however as she waits for the groom at the church he never shows up. He was enticed into going undercover in a jail to expose gang activity inside the jail, being promised a lot of money and prestige for the story. Before leaving for the assignment he writes a letter to his beloved, but his publisher rips it up, so she thinks he has gotten cold feet and she gets angry at him for deserting her. Meanwhile, he exposes corrupt activity inside the jail. Will his beloved ever find out the truth of why he never showed up to marry her?

Cast
James Dunn as Don McLane
Mae Clarke as Martha Allen
Neil Hamilton as Gerald Raeburn
Sidney Toler as Warden Palmer
Warren Hymer as Pete Hogan
Stanley Fields as Rafferty
Madge Bellamy as Sally
Frank Melton as Cub Reporter
Raymond Hatton as Flaherty
Jack La Rue as Cubby
Arthur Treacher as Col. Baggott
Dorothy Christy as Helen Kay
Robert Gleckler as Editor Hooley
William Pawley as Muggs
Phil Tead as Cripps

References

External links 
 

1935 films
1930s English-language films
20th Century Fox films
American comedy films
1935 comedy films
Films directed by William A. Seiter
American black-and-white films
1930s American films